Donald Kirk Blackmon (born March 14, 1958) is an American football coach and former  linebacker. Most recently he was the defensive coordinator for the New York Sentinels of the United Football League.

Playing career
Blackmon was selected by the New England Patriots in the fourth round of the 1981 NFL Draft. A 6'3". 235 lbs. linebacker from the University of Tulsa, Blackmon played his entire NFL career for the Patriots. He started 72 of 89 games and recorded 541 tackles, 30.5 sacks, and five interceptions before being forced to retire after a neck injury in a game against the Raiders in 1987. He was on the Patriots AFC title team in 1986. Blackmon was a three time all-conference selection at Tulsa and has been named to the school's Hall of Fame.

References

External links
 Tulsa Golden Hurricane alumni bio

1958 births
Living people
American football defensive ends
American football linebackers
Atlanta Falcons coaches
Buffalo Bills coaches
Cleveland Browns coaches
Kansas City Chiefs coaches
New England Patriots coaches
New England Patriots players
New York Giants coaches
New York Sentinels coaches
Tulsa Golden Hurricane football players
National Football League defensive coordinators